Søm is a district in the city of Kristiansand in Agder county, Norway. With a population of about 9,500 (2022), it is the third largest district in Kristiansand. The district is a part of the borough of Oddernes. Søm has borders with the district of Hånes to the north, the district of Randesund to the east and south, and the Topdalsfjorden to the west. Søm is the second most wealthy district in Kristiansand after Lund.  Søm Church is located in the district.

Neighbourhoods

Transportation

Media gallery

References

Populated places in Agder
Geography of Kristiansand
Boroughs of Kristiansand